"Howl", also known as "Howl for Carl Solomon", is a poem written by Allen Ginsberg in 1954–1955 and published in his 1956 collection Howl and Other Poems.  The poem is dedicated to Carl Solomon.

Ginsberg began work on "Howl" in 1954. In the Paul Blackburn Tape Archive at the University of California, San Diego, Ginsberg can be heard reading early drafts of his poem to his fellow writing associates. "Howl" is considered to be one of the great works of American literature. It came to be associated with the group of writers known as the Beat Generation.

It is not true that "Howl" was written as a performance piece and later published by poet Lawrence Ferlinghetti of City Lights Books. This myth was perpetuated by Ferlinghetti as part of the defense's case during the poem's obscenity trial. Upon the poem's release, Ferlinghetti and the bookstore's manager, Shigeyoshi Murao, were charged with disseminating obscene literature, and both were arrested. On October 3, 1957, Judge Clayton W. Horn ruled that the poem was not obscene.

Writing 
According to Ginsberg's bibliographer and archivist Bill Morgan, it was a terrifying peyote vision that was the principal inspiration for Howl. This occurred on the evening of October 17, 1954, in the Nob Hill apartment of Sheila Williams, Ginsberg's girlfriend at that time, with whom he was living. Ginsberg had the terrifying experience of seeing the façade of the Sir Francis Drake Hotel in the San Francisco fog as the monstrous face of a child-eating demon. As was his wont, Ginsberg took notes on his vision, and these became the basis for Part II of the poem.

In late 1954 and 1955, in an apartment he had rented at 1010 Montgomery Street in the North Beach neighborhood of San Francisco, Ginsberg worked on the poem, originally referring to it by the working title "Strophes." Some drafts were purportedly written at a coffeehouse called Caffe Mediterraneum in Berkeley, California; Ginsberg had moved into a small cottage in Berkeley a few blocks from the campus of the University of California on September 1, 1955. Many factors went into the creation of the poem. A short time before the composition of "Howl", Ginsberg's therapist, Dr. Philip Hicks, encouraged him to realize his desire to quit his market-research job and pursue poetry full-time and to accept his own homosexuality. He experimented with a syntactic subversion of meaning called parataxis in the poem "Dream Record: June 8, 1955" about the death of Joan Vollmer, a technique that became central in "Howl".

Ginsberg showed this poem to Kenneth Rexroth, who criticized it as too stilted and academic; Rexroth encouraged Ginsberg to free his voice and write from his heart. Ginsberg took this advice and attempted to write a poem with no restrictions. He was under the immense influence of William Carlos Williams and Jack Kerouac and attempted to speak with his own voice spontaneously. Ginsberg began the poem in the stepped triadic form he took from Williams but, in the middle of typing the poem, his style altered such that his own unique form (a long line based on breath organized by a fixed base) began to emerge.

Ginsberg experimented with this breath-length form in many later poems. The first draft contained what later became Part I and Part III. It is noted for relating stories and experiences of Ginsberg's friends and contemporaries, its tumbling, hallucinatory style, and the frank address of sexuality, specifically homosexuality, which subsequently provoked an obscenity trial. Although Ginsberg referred to many of his friends and acquaintances (including Neal Cassady, Jack Kerouac, William S. Burroughs, Peter Orlovsky, Lucien Carr, and Herbert Huncke), the primary emotional drive was his sympathy for Carl Solomon, to whom it was dedicated; he had met Solomon in a mental institution and became friends with him.

Ginsberg later stated this sympathy for Solomon was connected to bottled-up guilt and sympathy for his mother's schizophrenia (she had been lobotomized), an issue he was not yet ready to address directly. In 2008, Peter Orlovsky told the co-directors of the 2010 film Howl that a short moonlit walk—during which Orlovsky sang a rendition of the Hank Williams song "Howlin’ At the Moon"—may have been the encouragement for the title of Ginsberg's poem. "I never asked him, and he never offered," Orlovsky told them, "but there were things he would pick up on and use in his verse form some way or another. Poets do it all the time." The Dedication by Ginsberg states he took the title from Kerouac.

Performance and publication
The poem was first performed at the Six Gallery in San Francisco on October 7, 1955.
|-
|"who jumped off the Brooklyn Bridge..."
|A specific reference to Tuli Kupferberg.
|-
|"who crashed through their minds in jail..."
|A reference to Jean Genet's Le Condamné à mort.
|-
|"who retired to Mexico to cultivate a habit, or Rocky Mount to tender Buddha or Tangiers to boys or Southern Pacific to the black locomotive or Harvard to Narcissus to Woodlawn to the daisychain or grave"
|Many of the Beats went to Mexico City to "cultivate" a drug "habit", but Ginsberg claims this is a direct reference to Burroughs and Bill Garver, though Burroughs lived in Tangiers at the time (as Ginsberg says in "America" "Burroughs is in Tangiers I don't think he'll come back it's sinister"). Rocky Mount, North Carolina, is where Jack Kerouac's sister lived (as recounted in The Dharma Bums). Also, Neal Cassady was a brakeman for the Southern Pacific. John Hollander was an alumnus of Harvard. Ginsberg's mother Naomi lived near Woodlawn Cemetery.
|-
|"Accusing the radio of hypnotism..."
|A reference to Ginsberg's mother Naomi, who suffered from paranoid schizophrenia. It also refers to Antonin Artaud's reaction to shock therapy and his "To Have Done with the Judgement of God", which Solomon introduced to Ginsberg at Columbia Presbyterian Psychological Institute.
|-
|From "who threw potato salad at CCNY lecturers on Dadaism..." to "resting briefly in catatonia"
|A specific reference to Carl Solomon. Initially this final section went straight into what is now Part III, which is entirely about Carl Solomon. An art movement emphasizing nonsense and irrationality. In the poem, it is the subject of a lecture that is interrupted by students throwing potato salad at the professors. This ironically mirrored the playfulness of the movement but in a darker context. A Post WW1 cultural movement, Dada stood for 'anti-art', it was against everything that art stood for. Founded in Zurich, Switzerland. The meaning of the word means two different definitions; "hobby horse" and "father", chosen randomly. The Dada movement spread rapidly.
|-
|"Pilgrim's State's Rockland's and Greystone's foetid halls ..." and "I'm with you in Rockland"
|These are mental institutions associated with either Ginsberg's mother Naomi or Carl Solomon: Pilgrim State Hospital and Rockland State Hospital in New York and Greystone Park State Hospital in New Jersey. Ginsberg met Solomon at Columbia Presbyterian Psychological Institute, but "Rockland" was frequently substituted for "rhythmic euphony".
|-
|"with mother finally ******"
|Ginsberg admitted that the deletion here was an expletive. He left it purposefully elliptical "to introduce appropriate element of uncertainty". In later readings, many years after he was able to distance himself from his difficult history with his mother, he reinserted the word "fucked".
|-
|"obsessed with a sudden flash of the alchemy of the use of the ellipse the catalog the meter (alt: variable measure) & the vibrating plane". Also, from "who dreamt and made incarnate gaps in Time & Space" to "what might be left to say in time come after death".
|This is a recounting of Ginsberg's discovery of his own style and the debt he owed to his strongest influences. He discovered the use of the ellipse from haiku and the shorter poetry of Ezra Pound and William Carlos Williams. "The catalog" is a reference to Walt Whitman's long line style which Ginsberg adapted. "The meter"/"variable measure" is a reference to Williams' insistence on the necessity of measure. Though "Howl" may seem formless, Ginsberg claimed it was written in a concept of measure adapted from Williams' idea of breath, the measure of lines in a poem being based on the breath in reading. Ginsberg's breath in reading, he said, happened to be longer than Williams'. "The vibrating plane" is a reference to Ginsberg's discovery of the "eyeball kick" in his study of Cézanne.
|-
|"Pater Omnipotens Aeterna Deus"/"omnipotent, eternal father God"
|This was taken directly from Cézanne.
|-
|"to recreate the measure and syntax of poor human prose..."
|A reference to the tremendous influence Kerouac and his ideas of "Spontaneous Prose" had on Ginsberg's work and specifically this poem.
|-
|"what might be left to say in time come after death"
|A reference to Louis Zukofsky's translation of Catullus: "What might be left to say anew in time after death..." Also a reference to a section from the final pages of Visions of Cody, "I'm writing this book because we're all going to die," and so on.
|-
|"eli eli lama sabachthani"
|One of the sayings of Jesus on the cross, also Psalm 22:1: "My God, my God, why have you forsaken me?" The phrase in Psalms was transliterated as azavtani; however, Ginsberg stayed true to how Jesus translated the phrase in the Gospels. The phrase used by Ginsberg was translated properly as "Why have you sacrificed me?" This ties into the themes of misfortune and religious adulation of conformity through the invocation of Moloch in Part II. Though Ginsberg grew up in an agnostic household, he was very interested in his Jewish roots and in other concepts of spiritual transcendence. Although later Ginsberg was a devoted Buddhist, at this time he was only beginning to study Buddhism along with other forms of spirituality.
|}
</blockquote>

Part II

Part III

Footnote to "Howl"

Critical reception
The New York Times sent Richard Eberhart to San Francisco in 1956 to report on the poetry scene there. The result of Eberhart's visit was an article published in the September 2, 1956 New York Times Book Review titled "West Coast Rhythms". Eberhart's piece helped call national attention to "Howl" as "the most remarkable poem of the young group" of poets who were becoming known as the spokespersons of the Beat generation.

On October 7, 2005, celebrations marking the 50th anniversary of the first reading of the poem were staged in San Francisco, New York City, and in Leeds in the UK. The British event, Howl for Now, was accompanied by a book of essays of the same name, edited by Simon Warner and published by Route Publishing (Howl for Now ) reflecting on the piece's enduring influence.

1997 broadcasting controversy
Boston independent alternative rock radio station WFNX became the first commercial radio station to broadcast "Howl" on Friday, July 18, 1997, at 6:00 PM despite Federal Communications Commission (FCC) Safe Harbor laws which allow for mature content later at night.

2007 broadcasting fears
In late August 2007, Ron Collins, Lawrence Ferlinghetti, Nancy Peters, Bill Morgan, Peter Hale, David Skover, Al Bendich (one of Ferlinghetti's lawyers in the 1957 obscenity trial), and Eliot Katz petitioned Pacifica Radio to air Ginsberg's Howl on October 3, 2007, to commemorate the 50th anniversary of the verdict declaring the poem to be protected under the First Amendment against charges of obscenity. Fearing fines from the FCC, Pacifica New York radio station WBAI opted not to broadcast the poem. The station chose instead to play the poem on a special webcast program, replete with commentary (by Bob Holman, Regina Weinreich and Ron Collins, narrated by Janet Coleman), on October 3, 2007.

Legacy 

Part II of the poem was used as libretto for Song #7 in Hydrogen Jukebox, a 1990 chamber opera using a selection of Ginsberg's poems set to music by Philip Glass.

Film

The 2010 film Howl explored Ginsberg's life and works. Constructed in a nonlinear fashion, the film juxtaposes historical events with a variety of cinematic techniques. It reconstructs  the early life of Ginsberg during the 1940s and 1950s. It also re-enacts Ginsberg's debut performance of "Howl" at the Six Gallery Reading on October 7, 1955, in black-and-white., though the readings by the other four Six Gallery poets are not recreated in the film. In addition, parts of the poem are interpreted through animated sequences. Finally, these events are juxtaposed with color images of Ferlinghetti's 1957 obscenity trial.

References

Further reading
 Collins, Ronald & Skover, David. Mania: The Story of the Outraged & Outrageous Lives that Launched a Cultural Revolution (Top-Five Books, March 2013)
Charters, Ann (ed.). The Portable Beat Reader. Penguin Books. New York. 1992.  (hc);  (pbk)
Ginsberg, Allen. Howl. 1986 critical edition edited by Barry Miles, Original Draft Facsimile, Transcript & Variant Versions, Fully Annotated by Author, with Contemporaneous Correspondence, Account of First Public Reading, Legal Skirmishes, Precursor Texts & Bibliography  (pbk.)
Howl of the Censor. Jake Ehrlich, Editor. 
 Lounela, Pekka — Mäntylä, Jyrki: Huuto ja meteli. [Howl and turmoil.] Hämeenlinna, Karisto. 1970.
Miles, Barry. Ginsberg: A Biography. London: Virgin Publishing Ltd. (2001), paperback, 628 pages, 
Raskin, Jonah. American Scream: Allen Ginsberg's "Howl" and the Making of the Beat Generation. Berkeley: University of California Press, 2004.

External links
Allen Ginsberg.org
The Poetry Archive: Allen Ginsberg
Allen Ginsberg on Poets.org With audio clips, poems, and related essays, from the Academy of American Poets
Full text of "Howl" and "Footnote to Howl" at the Poetry Foundation
Allen Ginsberg reads Howl. 27 minutes of audio.
Naropa Audio Archives: Allen Ginsberg class (August 6, 1976) Streaming audio and 64 kbit/s MP3 ZIP
Naropa Audio Archives: Anne Waldman and Allen Ginsberg reading, including Howl (August 9, 1975) Streaming audio and 64 kbit/s MP3 ZIP
Allen Ginsberg Live in London -- live film from October 19, 1995
After 50 Years, Ginsberg's "Howl" Still Resonates
Reading of Howl and other poems at Reed College, Portland, Oregon, February 1956
 Howls of Anger, and of Liberation by The Nation
 "Howl for Carl Solomon", manuscript and typescript, with autograph corrections and annotations, Stanford Digital Repository

Poetry by Allen Ginsberg
Beat poetry
1955 poems
1950s LGBT literature
LGBT poetry
Works about labor
Culture in the San Francisco Bay Area
City Lights Publishers books
San Francisco Bay Area literature
Obscenity controversies in literature
LGBT literature in the United States
United States National Recording Registry recordings
LGBT-related controversies in literature